Louis Marchegay (5 October 1869 Rochefort – 15 September 1933, Saint-Germain-de-Prinçay), was a French politician.

Biography 
He gained a degree in law at Sciences Po, and he was elected as a deputy for Vendée in 1895 after the death of Aristide Batiot. He lost the next election and he was replaced by Zénobe Alexis de Lespinay.

As he had lands, he was elected as the President of the Portland Artificial Cement of Indochina.

External links 
 Fiche sur Assemblée nationale

1869 births
1933 deaths
People from Rochefort, Charente-Maritime
Politicians from Nouvelle-Aquitaine
Members of the 6th Chamber of Deputies of the French Third Republic
Sciences Po alumni